Who Shot Pat? (promoted as Who Shot Patakango?) is a 1989 movie starring Sandra Bullock.

Plot
The film is set in Brooklyn, New York and focuses on the coming of age of a group of high school students in the late 1950s. Bic Bickham (played by actor David Edwin Knight), a student at a vocational high school in Brooklyn falls in love with Devlin Moran, a private school student from a wealthy family. The movie highlights the tough streets of New York City in the 1950s and the final realization that a gang is nothing more than a bunch of bums, reminiscent of The Outsiders.

Cast
 David Edwin Knight as Bic Bickham
 Sandra Bullock as Devlin Moran
 Kevin Otto as Mark Bickham
 Aaron Ingram as Cougar
 Brad Randall as Patakango
 Chris Cardona as Freddie
 Michael Puzzo as Goldie
 Christopher Crean as Tony
 Gregg Marc Miller as Vinnie
 Damon Chandler as Mr. Donnelly
 Bridget Fogle as Mitsy
 Phil Rosenthal as Principal
 Clint Jordan as Ricky (Dick)
 Ella Arolovi as Marianna
 Nicholas Reiner as Carmen
 Henry Paul as Dice Player
 Allison Janney as Miss Penny

References

External links
 
 

1989 films
Films set in New York City
Films set in the 1950s